Alexandros Tsanikidis is a Greek boxer. In 2018, he won a bronze medal at the 2018 Mediterranean Games. Also in 2013, he won a bronze medal at the 2013 Mediterranean Games.

References

Greek male boxers
Mediterranean Games bronze medalists for Greece
Competitors at the 2018 Mediterranean Games
Mediterranean Games medalists in boxing
Living people
1994 births
European Games competitors for Greece
Boxers at the 2019 European Games
Light-welterweight boxers
21st-century Greek people